The episodes in this list are fromZyuden Sentai Kyoryuger Individual episodes are known as " [number]. All of the episodes were written by Riku Sanjo.

Episodes


{| class="wikitable" width="98%"
|- style="border-bottom:8px solid Yellow"
! width="4%" | Brave no. !!Title
! Original airdate
|-|colspan="4" bgcolor="#e6e9ff"|

He's Here! The Red King

|-|colspan="4" bgcolor="#e6e9ff"|

Gaburincho! Snapping Combination

|-|colspan="4" bgcolor="#e6e9ff"|

Get Mad! The Slashing Brave

|-|colspan="4" bgcolor="#e6e9ff"|

Fire! The Courageous Gaburivolver

|-|colspan="4" bgcolor="#e6e9ff"|

Boom! The Cavities of Ankydon

|-|colspan="4" bgcolor="#e6e9ff"|

Stop! Singing Canderrilla

|-|colspan="4" bgcolor="#e6e9ff"|

Angry! Daigo's in Big Trouble

|-|colspan="4" bgcolor="#e6e9ff"|

Where Am I? Get Through the Maze

|-|colspan="4" bgcolor="#e6e9ff"|

So Strong! PteraidenOh

|-|colspan="4" bgcolor="#e6e9ff"|

Zandar! Gold Revival

|-|colspan="4" bgcolor="#e6e9ff"|

Utchy! How Cool

|-|colspan="4" bgcolor="#e6e9ff"|

Attack! The King and I

|-|colspan="4" bgcolor="#e6e9ff"|

Jakireen! I'll Protect Your Heart

|-|colspan="4" bgcolor="#e6e9ff"|

Watch Out! The Spirit Base

|-|colspan="4" bgcolor="#e6e9ff"|

How Annoying! Dogold's Ambition

|-|colspan="4" bgcolor="#e6e9ff"|

Dig-a-dug! My Treasure

|-|colspan="4" bgcolor="#e6e9ff"|

Serious! Kyoryu Gray

|-|colspan="4" bgcolor="#e6e9ff"|

Caught! Kung-Fu Strike

|-|colspan="4" bgcolor="#e6e9ff"|

Kyawaeen! Kidnapped Family

|-|colspan="4" bgcolor="#e6e9ff"|

Unluckyu! The Tanabata Windfall

|-|colspan="4" bgcolor="#e6e9ff"|

Zuon! Plezuon Returns

|-|colspan="4" bgcolor="#e6e9ff"|

Im-poss-i-ble! Deboth Resurrects

|-|colspan="4" bgcolor="#e6e9ff"|

Go! Bakuretsu Kyoryuzin

|-|colspan="4" bgcolor="#e6e9ff"|

Burn! The Seven Kyoryugers

|-|colspan="4" bgcolor="#e6e9ff"|

What's This! The Deboth Army's Nightmare

|-|colspan="4" bgcolor="#e6e9ff"|

Oh My! The Gabutyra Human

|-|colspan="4" bgcolor="#e6e9ff"|

O Matsurincho! Red's Super Evolution

|-|colspan="4" bgcolor="#e6e9ff"|

Ah Torin! The Hundred Million-Year-Old Grudge

|-|colspan="4" bgcolor="#e6e9ff"|

Big Attack! Dance Carnival

|-|colspan="4" bgcolor="#e6e9ff"|

Give It to Me! The Guardians' Fragment

|-|colspan="4" bgcolor="#e6e9ff"|

Vacance! The Eternal Holiday

|-|colspan="4" bgcolor="#e6e9ff"|

Victory! It's a Sports Match

|-|colspan="4" bgcolor="#e6e9ff"|

Maximum! I Will Protect the Lady

|-|colspan="4" bgcolor="#e6e9ff"|

Revival! Bragigas Appears

|-|colspan="4" bgcolor="#e6e9ff"|

Super Awesome! Gigant Kyoryuzin

|-|colspan="4" bgcolor="#e6e9ff"|

Giga Gaburincho! The Silver Miracle

|-|colspan="4" bgcolor="#e6e9ff"|

Revenge! The Ghost Deboth Army

|-|colspan="4" bgcolor="#e6e9ff"|

Love Touch! The Too Beautiful Zorima

|-|colspan="4" bgcolor="#e6e9ff"|

Full Force! The Ten Kyoryugers' Power

|-|colspan="4" bgcolor="#e6e9ff"|

Wowie! Pops Is Broken-Hearted

|-|colspan="4" bgcolor="#e6e9ff"|

Yanasanta! The Deboth World War

|-|colspan="4" bgcolor="#e6e9ff"|

Wonderful! Christmas of Justice

|-|colspan="4" bgcolor="#e6e9ff"|

The Blade of the Soul! Roar, Straizer

|-|colspan="4" bgcolor="#e6e9ff"|

Chaos Laughs! Destruction's Countdown

|-|colspan="4" bgcolor="#e6e9ff"|

That Can't Be Dad! The End of Silver

|-|colspan="4" bgcolor="#e6e9ff"|

The Great Duel! The Strike of Love and Tears

|-|colspan="4" bgcolor="#e6e9ff"|

The Great Counterattack! The Greatest Final Brave

|-|colspan="4" bgcolor="#e6e9ff"|

The Big Explosion! Goodbye Kyoryugers

|}

References

Zyuden Sentai Kyoryuger